Funcho is a Youtube comedy channel based out of India. Funcho have featured in India's Top 100 Digital Stars, 2022 by Forbes magazine.

History 
Funcho was founded in 2017 by two engineers, Shyam Sharma and Dhruv Shah.

The channel name "Funcho", was chosen as it means laughter. The channel has over 3.5 million subscribers and more than 200 uploads on YouTube as of February 2023.

Career 
In November 2022, DJ Snake invited Funcho to join in his India tour. Funcho had a special meeting with Priyanka Chopra in Mumbai in 2022. In 2022, Funcho featured on India's Top 100 Digital Stars, by Forbes India, were ranked 12th on the list. In 2023, Funcho were nominated for comedy category at Creators United Awards.

Veracity 
The channel has celebrated its reach to a 1 million audience by performing a live play at B N Vaidya Hall, Dadar East of Mumbai. The event was crowded with about 500 fans from across Maharastra and neighboring states.

Video format 
The channel produces content based on trending topics and day-to-day occurrences. They also create skits, dramas, and comedies about current happenings. The skits they produce are often very topical and relatable. Their fans are labeled as "Bachie Gang".

Controversies 
In 2018, Funcho made a video with moving train on Kiki challange. Following the video went viral, they were arrested and produced at Vasai Railway Court. The court sentenced them to clean railway station for three consecutive days.

References 

YouTube channels launched in 2017
Indian comedians
Indian YouTubers
Comedy YouTubers
Indian male comedians